Vaine Iriano Wichman is a Cook Islands politician and development economist. She is a member of the Cook Islands Party.

Background 
Wichman received her MSc in Development Economics from the University of Bradford in 1987. In 2006, she attended the Leaders in Development course at the Harvard Kennedy School.

Career 
From 2004 to 2006 Wichman was a member of the 11th Cook Islands Parliament, representing Ruaau. She won with 55.1% of the votes. She ran in the 2003 by-election for Ruaau, but was defeated by Geoffrey Heather.

In 2012 Wichman was re-elected to a second term as President of the Cook Islands National Council of Women (CINCW).

As a development economist Wichman has produced a number of reports for the Asian Development Bank including:
 Revamping the Cook Islands Public Sector (2008)
 Making Things Simpler?: Harmonizing Aid Delivery in the Cook Islands (2008)
She is also the author of From Words to Wheelbarrows: the Nukuroa Revolving Fund and Fishing for Answers: Socio-economic Assessment of the Rarotonga Game and Small Scale Fishing Industry.

Wichman is currently the Cook Islands In-Country Co-ordinator for the University of the South Pactific EU Climate Change programme.

References 

Living people
20th-century births
Members of the Parliament of the Cook Islands
Cook Islands Party politicians
Alumni of the University of Bradford
Harvard Kennedy School alumni
Year of birth missing (living people)